Children's World may refer to:
Children's World (charity), a United Kingdom-based charity focusing on special needs children
Children's World (magazine), an Indian children's magazine
Children's World (retailer), a former United Kingdom retail chain

See also
Kids World (disambiguation)